Cory Scott Juneau (born June 20, 1999, in San Diego, California) is an American skateboarder. He has competed in men's park events at several X Games, winning bronze in 2017 and finishing ninth in 2018 and 2019.

He competed in the men's park event at the 2020 Tokyo Olympics, where he won bronze.

References

External links
 
 
 
 

1999 births
Living people
American skateboarders
Olympic skateboarders of the United States
Olympic bronze medalists for the United States in skateboarding
Skateboarders at the 2020 Summer Olympics
Medalists at the 2020 Summer Olympics
World Skateboarding Championship medalists
X Games athletes
Sportspeople from San Diego